The 1899 Michigan Agricultural Aggies football team represented Michigan Agricultural College (MAC) in the 1899 college football season. In their first year under head coach Charles Bemies, the Aggies compiled a 2–4–1 record and outscored their opponents 142 to 127. Bemies was the first professional coach to lead the MAC football team. In the third game in the Michigan State–Notre Dame football rivalry, Notre Dame won the game at South Bend, Indiana, by 40 to 0 score as Notre Dame's captain McDonald scored five touchdowns.

Schedule

References

Michigan Agricultural
Michigan State Spartans football seasons
Michigan Agricultural Aggies football